Francine Toon (born 1986), also writing as Francine Elena, is a British writer.

Early life

Toon was born in Canterbury, England, in 1986, and moved to the Scottish Highlands, near Dornoch, at the age of nine after living in England and Portugal. After two years the family moved to St Andrews on the coast of Fife where Toon attended Madras College. She "returned regularly for holidays" to Sutherland "until she was into her late teens" and "the northern wilds have haunted her ever since, and form the backdrop to her debut novel". She attended Edinburgh University, where she wrote for The Student, before interning at Chambers Dictionaries.  After university she moved to London to work in publishing.  she was an editor at Sceptre.

Writing
Her debut novel, Pine, won the 2020 McIlvanney Prize for "the best Scottish crime book of the year", and was shortlisted for the 2020 Bloody Scotland Debut Prize and longlisted for the Highland Book Prize and the Deborah Rogers Foundation Writers Award. The Guardian's reviewer said that it "inhabits the woods and fells like a secretive wild animal" and called it a "well-written tale" but said that "What lets the narrative down is its reliance on the conventional tropes of the ghost-story genre." The Scotsman's reviewer found that "There’s much to admire in Pine" but that "There are, however, one or two issues with the predictability of the plot that detract from the whole." while saying that the book is "carefully calibrated to make every single hair on the back of your neck stand up on end as if you'd just heard a twig snap behind you in a forest at midnight." It was included in  The Telegraph's "Best first novels to look out for in 2020".

Her poetry, written under the name Francine Elena, has appeared in publications including The Best British Poetry 2013, The Best British Poetry 2015, The Sunday Times, Poetry London, Ambit, The Honest Ulsterman, The Quietus, and  Wasafiri.  She has interviewed other poets, including Mark Waldron for Prac Crit.

References

External links

Living people
21st-century British poets
21st-century British novelists
1986 births
People from Canterbury
People from Highland (council area)
People educated at Madras College
People from Fife
People from Sutherland
Alumni of the University of Edinburgh
Scottish women writers
Scottish book editors
21st-century British women writers
21st-century Scottish women writers